A Night Like This is the first album by Rebecka Törnqvist, released in 1993.

Tracks
 "Mary, Mary" (Pål Svenre)    (4:49)
 "Madrid"           (4:11)
  "Easy Come, Easy Go" (Pål Svenre) (Radio Mix)	 (4:30)
  "Everywhere" (Pål Svenre)    (4:09)
  "Nothing Ever" (Pål Svenre)  (4:50)
  "Here's That Rainy Day" (Jimmy Van Heusen, Johnny Burke)    (5:50)
  "Molly Says" (Pål Svenre)    (3:43)
  "Wander Where You Wander" (Pål Svenre)  (4:36)
  "Angel Eyes" (Matt Dennis, Earl Brent)    (5:54)
 "Do You Mind" (feat. Joe Williams)  (4:26)
 "One Hour Drive" (Pål Svenre)    (2:32)
 "I'll Wait" (Pål Svenre)    (6:25)

Charts

References 

1993 albums
Rebecka Törnqvist albums